This is a list of cities where trolleybuses operate, or operated in the past, as part of the public transport system. The original list has been divided to improve user-friendliness and to reduce article size. Separate lists—separate articles in Wikipedia—have been made for the following countries:

Americas
Brazil
Canada
United States
Europe (Note: countries not listed here are included in this article; see Contents table below)
France
Germany
Italy
Russia
Spain
Switzerland
Ukraine
United Kingdom

This page also provides references that are applicable to all parts of the complete list.

Bold typeface for a location city indicates an existing trolleybus system, currently in operation (temporary suspensions not counted), or a new system currently under construction.

Africa

Algeria

Egypt

Morocco

South Africa

Tunisia

Americas

Argentina

Brazil

Canada

Chile

Colombia

Cuba

Note: Tests began 18 September 1949 along tramway lines using "all-service vehicles" (dual-mode buses) purchased secondhand from Newark, New Jersey, US. The tests did not involve building new or converting existing supply because Havana's tramway had twin-wire overhead. Regular service was not operated.

Ecuador

Mexico

Note: The Mexico City trolleybus system was long thought to have opened in April 1952, but is now known to have opened more than a year earlier, in March 1951. Previous to that, there was an experimental line, for testing without passengers, in 1947 or 1948.

Peru

Trinidad and Tobago

United States

Uruguay

Venezuela

Asia

Afghanistan

Armenia

Azerbaijan

China

Georgia

India

 Note: In Kolkata (Calcutta), trial operation with a single trolleybus on a short test line took place in 1977.

Iran

Japan

Notes for the two tunnel trolleybus lines:
 The 6.1 km Kanden Tunnel Trolleybus line operated almost entirely in tunnel, through a mountain, and connected Ōgizawa Station with Kurobe Dam, for tourists and hikers. The transport service continues to operate, but no longer uses trolleybuses. Ōgizawa Station is in Ōmachi city, Nagano Prefecture.
 The affiliated 3.6 km Tateyama Tunnel Trolleybus line, similarly, operates entirely in tunnel and connects Daikanbo with Murodō. The line is located in Tateyama town, Toyama Prefecture.

Both lines are part of the Tateyama Kurobe Alpine Route. This passes through Chūbu-Sangaku National Park (also known in English as "Japan Alps National Park").

Kazakhstan

Note: A Russian-language source  states that system in the city of Turkistan became an unrealised project.

Kyrgyzstan

Malaysia

Mongolia

Myanmar

Nepal

North Korea

Note: Due to the incredibly limited streetview in North Korea and limited information, the main sources for trolleybus systems are national articles, tourist-related media, or satellite images. Some previously speculated systems in the central areas of Hyesan, Sunchon, Rajin-guyok (Sonbong county), Songrim, Kusong, and Haeju were largely disproven by available photos and videos, which show no trolleybuses of any kind. Some smaller systems may still be undiscovered. There is some unverified evidence of trolleybuses in the following towns:
Kapsan (Opened 12 October 1994? ) A 10-ri  (3.9 km) long trolleybus line from a mining village to (presumably) Kapsan mine. However, no trolleybuses infrastructure nor any trolleybuses are seen. If the system existed, it is almost certainly closed and dismantled.
Kujang County(Opened 4 November 1983?) Allegedly connects Ryongdung-rodongjagu with Ryongdung colliery, North Pyong'an Province. Some poles seen near railway station of unclear purpose.
Yonsan County images depict something similar to a trolleybus overhead.
According to trolley:motion, there is a system in Ryongdae, connecting Ryongdae railway station with a coal mine. (opened 10 June 1993?); no further proof exist.

Confirmation is lacking (Tarkhov and Merzlov).

Philippines

Saudi Arabia

Singapore

Sri Lanka

Tajikistan

Turkey

Turkmenistan

Uzbekistan

Note: A Russian-language source  states that systems were under construction in the following locations:
Angren
Chirchiq
Guliston
Qarshi
Kokand
Navoiy
Termez
Yangiabad

Vietnam

Europe

Austria

Goods (freight) line (trolleytruck):

Belarus

Note: Plans were announced in 2001 for new systems in:

Baranovichi

Barysaw

Lida

Molodechno

Novopolotsk

Orsha

Pinsk

Polotsk

Soligorsk

(Trolleybus Magazine)

Belgium (by province)

Antwerp (Antwerpen)

Brussels

 Note: The Brussels-Capital Region is not a province. Neither does it belong to one, nor does it contain any.

East Flanders (Oost-Vlaanderen)

Liège

Bosnia-Herzegovina

Bulgaria

Croatia

Czech Republic

Denmark

Estonia

Finland

France

Germany

Greece

Hungary

Italy

Latvia

Lithuania

Moldova

The Netherlands

Gelderland

Groningen

South Holland (Zuid-Holland)

Note for Rotterdam: Trolleybus overhead installed in the Maas tunnel in 1941, on instructions from German military authorities. Not used.

Norway

Poland

Portugal

Romania

First trolleybus system in Romania opened in Chernivtsi on 1 February 1939. Today, the city is part of Ukraine.

Russia

Serbia

Slovakia

Slovenia

Spain

Sweden

Switzerland

Turkey
See Asia section of list, above.  Although trolleybuses served the European part of Istanbul, the country's three other trolleybus systems (and a fourth under construction currently) were or are all located in the Asian part of Turkey.

Ukraine

United Kingdom

Oceania

Australia

New South Wales

Queensland

South Australia

Tasmania

Western Australia

New Zealand

United States (territories only, in Oceania)

Hawaii (Territory of)

Note: The trolleybus system existed only in the period before Hawaii became a U.S. state. For convenience, it is also included in List of trolleybus systems in the United States.

See also

Trolleybus usage by country
List of light-rail transit systems
List of town tramway systems
List of rapid transit systems

References

Books
Gregoris, Paolo; Rizzoli, Francesco; and Serra, Claudio. 2003. "Giro d'Italia in filobus". Cortona: Editore Calosci.
Jones, David. Australian Trolleybuses. Wellington: City Tramway Publications.
Mackinger, Gunter. 1979. "Obus in Österreich". (Eisenbahn-Sammelheft Nr. 16.) Wien: Verlag Slezak.
Millar, Sean. 1986. "Trolleybuses in New Zealand". Auckland: Millar Publishing.
Murray, Alan. 2000. "World Trolleybus Encyclopaedia". Yateley, Hampshire, UK: Trolleybooks.
Pabst, Martin. 1989. "Tram & Trolley in Africa". Krefeld: Röhr Verlag GMBH.
Peschkes, Robert. "World Gazetteer of Tram, Trolleybus, and Rapid Transit Systems."
Part One, Latin America. 1980. Exeter, UK: Quail Map Company.
Part Two, Asia+USSR / Africa / Australia. 1987. London: Rapid Transit Publications.
Part Three, Europe. 1993. London: Rapid Transit Publications.
Part Four, North America. 1998. London: Rapid Transit Publications.
Sebree, Mac, and Paul Ward. 1974. "The Trolley Coach in North America" (Interurbans Special 59). Los Angeles: Interurbans.
Stock, Werner. 1987. "Obus-Anlagen in Deutschland". Bielefeld: Hermann Busch Verlag.
"Straßenbahnatlas ehem. Sowjetunion" / "Tramway Atlas of the former USSR". 1996. Berlin: Arbeitsgemeinschaft Blickpunkt Straßenbahn, in conjunction with Light Rail Transit Association, London.
"Straßenbahnatlas Rumänien" (compiled by Andreas Günther, Sergei Tarkhov and Christian Blank). 2004. Berlin: Arbeitsgemeinschaft Blickpunkt Straßenbahn.
Tarkhov, Sergei. 2000. "Empire of the Trolleybus: Vol 1 - Russia". London: Rapid Transit Publications.
吉川文夫 (Yoshikawa, Fumio). 1995.　日本のトロリーバス (Nippon no "trolleybus"). Tokyo: kk Denkisha-kenkyûkai.

Periodicals
 "Trolleybus Magazine" (ISSN 0266-7452). National Trolleybus Association (UK). Bimonthly.
 Tarkhov, Sergei and Dmitriy Merzlov. "North Korean Surprises - Part 3". (Trolleybus Magazine No. 246, November–December 2002).

External links

All Time List of North American Trolleybus Systems (David Wyatt)
Bibliography of the Electric Trolleybus (Richard DeArmond)
 (Elektrotransport v gorodakh byvshego SSSR, Dmitry Zinoviev)
World tram and trolleybus systems (рус., en.)
Latin American Trolleybus Installations (Allen Morrison)
The Tramways of Cuba (Allen Morrison)
TrolleyMotion
Progetto Città Elettriche (Italy)
Tram.nu Atlas (Bruse LF Persson)
UK Trolleybus Systems & Museums (Bruce Lake)
Wires of Faded Glory (Richard A. Bílek)
World Trolleybus List - Systems Closed
Tom's North American Trolley bus Pix
TRANSIRA Association (Romanian Trolleybuses)
Trolleybus in Europe (public-transport.net)
World Map of Trolleybus systems in operation (TransPhoto)

 

Trolleybus systems
Trolleybus systems